All We Need is the debut studio album by American singer Raury. It was released on October 16, 2015, by LoveRenaissance and Columbia Records.

Critical reception

All We Need received generally positive reviews from music critics. At Metacritic, which assigns a normalized rating out of 100 to reviews from mainstream critics, the album received an average score of 67 based on 12 reviews, which indicates "generally favorable reviews".

Marcus Dowling of HipHopDX gave high praise to the album's multiple genre-hopping production and Raury's performance that evoke lyrics of optimism and melancholia reminiscent of Outkast and Arrested Development, concluding that "This isn’t an album, it’s the spiritual essence of the joy beyond the pain." Kyle Mullin of Exclaim! commented that Raury was more of a borrower of influences than finding his own style but gave praise to his messages and unique approach to sound, singling out "Friends" as who he truly is, concluding that it "bodes well for an eager young talent who not only has impeccable taste in mentors, but is also finding a strong voice of his own that's sure to inspire coming generations." Jamie Milton of DIY praised Raury for channelling his madcap artistic vision into a focused debut record, concluding that "It could be more unhinged, it could have been a chaotic, crazed mission statement – instead it’s further proof that Raury’s trade is in playing the unexpected hand."

Harriet Gibsone of The Guardian was ambivalent towards the album, feeling the songs were lost in their own messages, saying that "At times, Raury’s energy is more intriguing than his songwriting, and while the lack of cynicism in his lyrics is refreshing, you can’t help but question his decision to play the pop preacher." Pitchfork writer Sheldon Pearce said the record felt like a rehash of his Indigo Child mixtape, noting that the songs have unrefined mixes of different genres and told the same tales, saying that "With an album replete with Spanish guitar jams, wide-eyed hip-hop, and psychedelic rock k-holes, there isn't much ground left for Raury to cover." Adam Kivel of Consequence of Sound admired Raury for spreading his view of the world but found it mired by his choice in mismatched instrumentals and vocal delivery, saying that "All We Needs unflinching sincerity and positivity come with an equal portion of inconsistent, scattered focus."

Track listing

Personnel
Credits adapted from Tidal.

Musicians and production

 Raury – executive producer, lead vocals , acoustic guitar , bass guitar , percussion , keyboard , guitar 
 Justice Baiden – executive producer
 Adia – vocals , background vocals 
 Chris Arceneaux – drums 
 Denzel Baptiste – recording engineer 
 Sam Barsh – keyboard 
 Big K.R.I.T. – vocals 
 Matt Bishop – editor , recording engineer 
 Jon Castelli – mixing engineer 
 Matt Chamberlain – drums 
 Danger Mouse – bass guitar , drums , piano 
 DJ Khalil – recording engineer , keyboard , drums 
 Tom Elmhirst – mixing engineer 
 Chris Galland – assistant engineer 
 Om'Mas Keith – bass guitar 
 Key! – vocals 
 Dave Kutch – mastering engineer 
 Jacknife Lee – programmer , recording engineer , keyboard , guitar , percussion 
 Willie Linton – recording engineer , drums 
 Malay – recording engineer , acoustic guitar , bass guitar , piano 
 Manny Marroquin – mixing engineer 
 MUSYCA Children's Choir – choir vocals 
 Todd Monfalcone – guitar , assistant engineer , recording engineer 
 Jerome Monroe Jr. – piano 
 Tom Morello – electric guitar 
 Ryan Nasci – mixing engineer 
 RZA – vocals 
 Ike Schultz – assistant engineer 
 Dan Seeff – guitar , bass guitar 
 Malik Shakur – guitar 
 Kennie Takahasi – mixing engineer 
 Take a Daytrip – recording engineer 

Design

 Junia Abaidoo – product manager
 Erika Alfredson – product manager
 JR Lindsey – A&R
 Jimmy Nguyen – photography
 Carlon Ramong – creative director
 Hannah Sider – photography

Charts

References

2015 debut albums
Raury albums
Columbia Records albums
Albums produced by Malay (record producer)
Albums produced by Jacknife Lee
Albums produced by DJ Khalil
Albums produced by Danger Mouse (musician)